The 1923 Vermont Green and Gold football team was an American football team that represented  the University of Vermont as an independent during the 1923 college football season. In their third year under head coach Tom Keady, the team compiled a 6–3–1 record.

Schedule

References

Vermont
Vermont Catamounts football seasons
Vermont Green and Gold football